The Waisoi mine is a large copper mine located in the southern Fiji in Namosi Province. Waisoi represents one of the largest copper reserve in Fiji and in the world having estimated reserves of 950 million tonnes of ore grading 0.43% copper.

References 

Copper mines in Fiji